Hacıməmmədli or Gadzhymamedli or Gadzhi-Mamedli may refer to: 
Hacıməmmədli, Agdam, Azerbaijan
Hacıməmmədli, Jalilabad, Azerbaijan